The Moose River is an  stream in northern New Hampshire in the United States. It is a tributary of the Androscoggin River, which flows south and east into Maine, joining the Kennebec River near the Atlantic Ocean.

The Moose River rises in the town of Randolph, New Hampshire, on the northern slopes of Mount Adams. The river quickly enters the wide valley between the Presidential Range to the south and the Crescent Mountain Range to the north and turns east to flow to the Androscoggin River in Gorham. An inactive railroad line owned by the state of New Hampshire, now known as the Presidential Rail Trail, parallels the Moose River for most of the river's length.

See also

List of rivers of New Hampshire

References

Rivers of New Hampshire
Rivers of Coös County, New Hampshire